Pali Road is a 2015 romantic mystery thriller film directed by Jonathan Lim, starring Michelle Chen as a young doctor who finds herself in a completely unfamiliar life after waking up from a car accident. The film co-stars Jackson Rathbone, Sung Kang and Henry Ian Cusick.

It was filmed in early 2015 on Oahu, Hawaii. The film had its world premier at the Hawaii International Film Festival in November 2015, where it was nominated for the Halekulani Golden Orchid Award for Best Feature Narrative.

The film earned an honorable mention for Best Feature Film at  CAAMFest and was nominated for the Grand Jury Award for Best Feature Film at the Los Angeles Asian Pacific Film Festival. It won the Best Supporting Actress award for Elizabeth Sung and Best New Director award for Jonathan Lim at the 12th Chinese American Film Festival.

The film had its U.S. theatrical release in major cities on April 29. It was released in China on November 25, 2016.

Synopsis

Lily (Michelle Chen), a young doctor, wakes up from a car accident and discovers she is living a completely different life. Now married to her boyfriend's rival, Dr. Mitch Kayne (Sung Kang), and a mother to a 5-year-old son, she has an established life she remembers nothing about.

Everyone around her denies that her boyfriend Neil (Jackson Rathbone) ever existed. As Lily begins to doubt her own sanity, memories of Neil resurface, causing unexplainable incidents. While desperately searching for the truth of her past life, she questions her entire existence.

Cast
Michelle Chen as Lily Zhang
Jackson Rathbone as Neil Lang  
Sung Kang as Mitch Kayne
Henry Ian Cusick as Tim Young 
Tzi Ma as Mr. Zhang
Elizabeth Sung as Mrs. Zhang
Lauren Sweetser as Amy Stole 
Maddox Lim as James Kayne

References

External links
 Pali Road Official Website

Films about Chinese Americans
2010s romantic thriller films
Films shot in Hawaii
2015 films
Chinese mystery thriller films
Chinese romantic thriller films
2010s mystery thriller films
Asian-American drama films
2010s English-language films
2010s American films